The Battle of Casalecchio took place on 26 June 1402 near the town of Casalecchio di Reno, near Bologna, in northern Italy.

A Bolognese army under Giovanni Bentivoglio opposed Gian Galeazzo Visconti, Duke of Milan. The city of Bologna was aided by the Republic of Florence that supplied 5,000 cavalry (Rose Brigade) commanded by Bernardo della Serra. The Lord of Padua sent cavalry and supplies along with two of his sons.

Visconti was aided by the Malatesta of Rimini and the Gonzaga of Mantua. With Facino Cane, the condottiero Ludovico Gabriotto Cantelli (Ludovico da Parma) commanded the Milanese vanguard of 8,000 cavalry.

The Bolognese-Florentine army was led by Muzio Attendolo, while the Milanese army was commanded by Alberico da Barbiano.

Battle
Barbiano had encamped the Milanese forces and initiated skirmishes with the Bolognese-Florentine troops. The Bolognese-Florentines appeared to have gained the advantage from this skirmish, so Bentivolgio ordered Bernardo's forces into the fray. Bernardo's refused and Bentivolgio marched his forces out and encamped, well fortified, at Casalecchio.

A few days later, after much discussion, the Milanese force marched in tight, orderly formation towards the Bolognese-Florentine camp. Caught completely by surprise, the Bolognese-Florentine army retreated leaving their camp in the hands of the Milanese. The Rose Brigade, which had withdrawn to higher ground to evaluate the situation, fled along with 200 lancers.

Giovanni Bentivoglio was captured and killed two days later. Gian Galeazzo Visconti took Bologna and planned to assault the Republic of Florence and city of Florence next. However, he fell ill on 10 August 1402 and died on 3 September.

References

Sources

1402 in Europe
1400s in the Holy Roman Empire
Conflicts in 1402
Casalecchio 1402
Casalecchio 1402
History of Bologna
Casalecchio 1402
15th century in the Republic of Florence